Atlastin, or Atlastin-1, is a protein that in humans is encoded by the ATL1 gene.

References

External links 
  GeneReviews/NCBI/NIH/UW entry on Spastic Paraplegia 3A

Further reading